New Brighton is a seaside resort and part of the town of Wallasey, Wirral, Merseyside, England.   It contains 23 buildings that are recorded in the National Heritage List for England as designated listed buildings.   Of these, three are listed at Grade II*, the middle of the three grades, and the others are at Grade II, the lowest grade.  In the early 19th century plans were made to develop the site of the resort as a fashionable watering place, and a number of large houses were built.  This was only partly successful, and the area later developed into a resort used mainly by the working class.  The listed buildings include some of the early large houses.  Other buildings include two lighthouses, a former fort, a church, three shelters on the sea front, a war memorial, and a former bank.

Key

Buildings

References
Citations

Sources

Listed buildings in Merseyside
Lists of listed buildings in Merseyside
Listed